Luís Machado (born 3 December 1925, date of death unknown) was a Portuguese professional rower who competed in the men's eight event at the 1948 Summer Olympics.

References

1925 births
Year of death missing
Portuguese male rowers
Olympic rowers of Portugal
Rowers at the 1948 Summer Olympics
Place of birth missing